Tyddyngwyn railway station was immediately north of the later  station in what was then Merionethshire, now Gwynedd, Wales.

Tyddyngwyn was an intermediate station on the  narrow gauge Festiniog and Blaenau Railway (F&BR); it opened with the line on 30 May 1868. The F&BR ran the three and a half route miles northwards from its southern terminus at Llan Ffestiniog to a junction with the Ffestiniog Railway (FR) at Dolgarregddu Junction near what is nowadays Blaenau Ffestiniog station.

The station was a passenger station, whose main but not sole traffic was quarrymen travelling to and from work

In common with all other F&BR stations there were no platforms, carriages were very low to the ground, so passengers boarded from and alighted to the trackside. The station had a single-storey building on the eastern side of the track. No details of the station's facilities have been published, though the standard work conjectures there may have been a siding. In common with Festiniog and Tan-y-Manod stations, the only published photographs were taken from a distance, they lend the buildings the appearance of corrugated iron. The sole close-up photo is of the line's northern terminus - . This shows the building to bear a striking resemblance to weatherboarding. If the line's other stations were made of the same material that would explain their corrugated mien.

Services
The February 1878 narrow gauge timetable shows that all trains called at all stations on the line, with
 Northbound ("Up")
 four public trains running Monday to Saturday
 an unadvertised morning workmen's train running Monday to Saturday
 two public evening trains on Saturdays only
 The journey time from Tyddyngwyn to Diphwys(F&BR) was 10 minutes.
 Southbound ("Down")
 four public trains running Monday to Saturday
 a morning workmen's train running Monday to Saturday
 two public evening trains on Saturdays only
 a teatime workmen's train on Saturdays only
 The journey time from Diphwys (F&BR) to Tyddyngwyn was 6 minutes.
 There was no Sunday service.

Diphwys was the F&BR's Blaenau station and would become the site of the town's later GWR station, but it was not the Festiniog Railway's  station. Through passengers from Tyddyngwyn to  would alight at the F&BR's Diphwys station and walk across Church Street in Blaenau to the Festiniog Railway's completely separate Duffws station. Most trains were timetabled to make this process workable, if tight. Whether connecting trains were held in the case of late running is not recorded.

In the line's early days trains many trains ran "mixed", but this was stopped in 1877. Unlike most railways in the area passengers were the line's mainstay. In 1879 - a typical year - passenger receipts were £1406 compared with £416 for goods. No figures have been published specifically for Tyddyngwyn.

The standard gauge approaches
On 1 September 1882 the standard gauge Bala and Festiniog Railway reached Llan Ffestiniog from the south, enabling a passenger from (say) Bala to Tyddyngwyn to transfer from a standard gauge train to a narrow gauge train at Llan by walking a few yards, much as modern-day passengers transfer between Conwy Valley Line and Ffestiniog Railway trains at Blaenau Ffestiniog.

From May 1882 the narrow gauge line was converted to standard gauge. Narrow gauge trains continued to operate during the conversion, using a third rail. Narrow gauge trains ceased running on 5 September 1883 with standard gauge services beginning on 10 September 1883. Tyddyngwyn was closed permanently when the narrow gauge ended, being replaced by  a few yards to the south when standard gauge services began.

It was demolished after closure, leaving no trace.

The line reopened
The line through the site of Tyddyngwyn station closed in 1961 but it was mothballed pending building the long-discussed cross-town link to enable trains to run along the Conwy Valley Line, through Blaenau and on to Trawsfynydd nuclear power station which was then being built. The line through the site reopened on 24 April 1964, but none of Tyddyngwyn's or Manod's facilities were brought back to life. The line closed again in 1998 as the nuclear plant was being decommissioned. Once more the route was mothballed in case a future use is found.

The station site in the 21st century
By 2011 the whole site had been completely demolished. In Spring 2016 the mothballed single track line still ran past the site to the former nuclear flask loading point. Tyddyngwyn Terrace, Manod lies northeast of the station site. The bridge visible beyond the station in the photograph reproduced by Boyd was still in place in 2015 at the western end of Arwain l; it would have afforded a grandstand view of the station.

The future
Between 2000 and 2011 there were at least two attempts to put the mothballed line through the site to use. In 2011 there were proposals to use the rails as a recreational velorail track. Neither this nor the earlier idea came to anything. The possibility remains that the surviving line could see future preservation or reuse by the nuclear industry.

To considerable local surprise fresh moves to reopen the line from Blaenau as far south as Trawsfynydd began in September 2016, with the formation of 
The Trawsfynydd & Blaenau Ffestiniog Community Railway Company. On 21 September at least one regional newspaper reported that "Volunteers are set to start work this weekend on clearing vegetation from the trackbed between Blaenau Ffestiniog and Trawsfynydd." The company was quoted as saying "We have been given a licence by Network Rail to clear and survey the line."

References

Sources

Further material

External links

 The station site on a navigable OS Map National Library of Scotland
 The site on a navigable 1953 OS map npe Maps
 The station and line Rail Map Online
 The line LJT2 with mileages Railway Codes
 Reminiscences by a local railwayman Forgotten Relics
 Festiniog and Blaenau Railway Festipedia
 Driver's view through the station to Blaenau YouTube
 Several photos of the line Penmorfa
 Several photos of the line Penmorfa
 The line in 2009 The Railway Muddler
 A special along the line 2D53
 Details of Summer 1989 excursions through the station Six Bells Junction
 Details and photos of 22 Jan 1961 railtour Six Bells Junction
 Photos of 22 Jan 1961 railtour Robert Darlaston
 The 22 Jan 1961 last train special YouTube
 An inspection saloon ride on the line, Part 1 YouTube
 An inspection saloon ride on the line, Part 2 YouTube
 Signal box diagram Signalling Record Society

Disused railway stations in Gwynedd
Railway stations in Great Britain opened in 1868
Railway stations in Great Britain closed in 1883
Blaenau Ffestiniog